Sandra Godinho (born 30 April 1973) is a Portuguese judoka. She competed at the 1992 Summer Olympics and the 2000 Summer Olympics.

References

External links
 

1973 births
Living people
Portuguese female judoka
Olympic judoka of Portugal
Judoka at the 1992 Summer Olympics
Judoka at the 2000 Summer Olympics
Sportspeople from Lisbon